Marc Cenedella (born September 15, 1970) is an American businessman and political candidate. He is the founding-CEO of Ladders, Inc., a United States-based company. He is also the founder of social app Knozen and has authored or co-authored several books.

Education
Cenedella graduated with a B.A. in political science from Yale University in 1992. He also earned an MBA from Harvard Business School in 1992, where he was named a Baker Scholar.

Career
Early in his career, Cenedella founded Forbes Pacifica Trading Company, an import-export business. He sold his interest in the company after graduating from Harvard Business School. Cenedella also worked for The Riverside Company, eventually becoming associate vice president of the organization. In 2000, Cenedella joined HotJobs, eventually becoming Senior Vice President of Finance & Operations. At the end of 2001, Cenedella orchestrated the sale of HotJobs to Yahoo! for $436 million.

Soon after leaving HotJobs, Cenedella teamed up with Alexandre Douzet and Andrew Koch, to create an online job search service aimed at $100K+ professionals. The company was launched under the name The Ladders in August 2003.

On October 10, 2011, then New York City Mayor Michael Bloomberg announced that Cenedella was part of his ten-strong "Council on Tech" to help drive the city toward greater tech growth.

In 2012, Cenedella was laying the groundwork for a United States Senate campaign in New York for the seat held by Kirsten E. Gillibrand, but decided not to run after some allegedly racy blog posts were found on his website.

In 2014, Cenedella launched a social mobile app called Knozen.

Cenedella is a writer and contributor to Muck Rack, an aggregator of articles and news to sites like Medium, Business Insider, HuffPost, The Independent, New York Post, Entrepreneur Magazine, and Fast Company.

In 2022, Cenedella announced that he is running in the Republican primary for the U.S. House of Representatives in New York's 23rd District, however he withdrew before the primary.

See also
TheLadders.com

References

Living people
American business executives
1970 births
Yale College alumni
Harvard Business School alumni